WLOD (1140 AM), is a radio station broadcasting from Loudon, Tennessee, just southwest of Knoxville, and was formerly owned by Blount Broadcasting Corporation. On October 14, 2021, at 15:30, began operating under a Local Marketing Agreemnt with Radio Loudon LLC. Radio Loudon LLC then became the licensee on March 22, 2022. WLOD began airing Scott Shannon's True Oldies Channel on April 1, 2022 at Midnight.

The station first signed on the air on January 1, 1983, as WLNT.  Because AM 1140 is a clear channel frequency reserved for Class A stations WRVA in Richmond and XEMR in Monterrey, Mexico, WLOD must sign-off at sunset to avoid interfering with those stations. July 27th, 2020 WLOD added FM translator W284DC at 104.7Mhz

Previous Ownership History:

Tellico Broadcasting Company 1/1/83-09/25/1985
Owners: James McGhee & Howard Oberholtzer Jr.
Studios located at 405 Mulberry Street, Loudon TN

Loudon Broadcasters 09/25/1985-10/27/1998
Owners: Gene Chrusciel & Doyle Lowe
Studios located at 405 Mulberry Street, Loudon TN

Metrowest/Horne Radio 10/27/1998-12/4/2009
Owner: Doug Horne
Studios located at 317 Watt Road, Farragut TN

Blount Broadcasting 12/04/2009-3/22/2022
Owners: Jim & Johnnie Sexton
Studios located at 261 Hannum Street Alcoa, TN

References

External links

LOD
Loudon County, Tennessee
Classic country radio stations in the United States
Radio stations established in 1983
1983 establishments in Tennessee
LOD